The 2022–23 season is the 113th season of competitive football in Germany.

Promotion and relegation

Pre-season

National teams

Germany national football team

Kits

2022–23 UEFA Nations League

2022–23 UEFA Nations League A Group 3

2022–23 UEFA Nations League fixtures and results

2022 FIFA World Cup

2022 FIFA World Cup Group E

2022 FIFA World Cup fixtures and results

Friendly matches

Germany women's national football team

Kits

UEFA Women's Euro 2022

UEFA Women's Euro 2022 Group B

UEFA Women's Euro 2022 fixtures and results

2023 FIFA Women's World Cup qualification

2023 FIFA Women's World Cup qualification Group H

2023 FIFA Women's World Cup qualification fixtures and results

Friendly matches

League season

Men

Bundesliga

Bundesliga standings

2. Bundesliga

2. Bundesliga standings

3. Liga

3. Liga standings

Women

Frauen-Bundesliga

Frauen-Bundesliga standings

2. Frauen-Bundesliga

2. Frauen-Bundesliga standings

Cup competitions

Men

DFB-Pokal

DFL-Supercup

Women

DFB-Pokal Frauen

German clubs in Europe

UEFA Super Cup

UEFA Champions League

Group stage

Group B

Group C

Group D

Group F

Group G

Knockout phase

Round of 16

|}

Quarter-finals

|}

UEFA Europa League

Group stage

Group D

Group G

Knockout stage

Knockout round play-offs

|}

Round of 16

|}

Quarter-finals

|}

UEFA Europa Conference League

Qualifying phase and play-off round

Play-off round

|}

Group stage

Group D

UEFA Women's Champions League

Qualifying rounds

Round 1

Semi-finals

|}

Final

|}

Round 2

|}

Group stage

Group B

Group D

Knockout phase

Quarter-finals

|}

References

 
Seasons in German football